Mysteries of Funk is an album by the English drum and bass artist Grooverider, released in 1998. The album's first single was "Rainbows of Colour".

The album peaked at No. 50 on the UK Albums Chart.

Production
The album was engineered by Optical.

Critical reception
The Washington Post thought that "with its jazzy trumpets and congas and its ethereal synths, it seems to owe as much to the Star Trek TV show (which is sampled on several cuts) as to James Brown." Rolling Stone concluded that "there's something dutiful about the music, as if Grooverider simply made a record because he thinks that's what big-time DJs are supposed to do."

The Observer wrote that "the best passages of Mysteries of Funk entwine d'n'b's percussive intricacy with languorous jazzy moods of a Miles Davis hue ... Against this are dull 10-minute tracks stuck in a tape loop." The New York Times called Mysteries of Funk "an elegant record with many textures, many instruments and blissful serenity amid hurtling beats."

AllMusic wrote that the album "succeeds most when Groove is wrapping his drum'n'bass two-step around a distinctly mainstream attention to house and fusion ambience."

Track listing

Credits
Grooverider - lead member, producer, programming, keyboards
Optical - engineer
Tom Harrison - bass
Roya Arab - composer, performer, vocals
Cleveland Watkiss - vocals
Sophie Barker - vocals
Andrew Blick - trumpet

References

External links

Grooverider albums
1998 debut albums